Amalia Nieto (3 August 1907 – 7 February 2003) was a Uruguayan painter, engraver, and sculptor. She was a member of the Constructive Art Association led by Joaquín Torres-García and creator of her own style that stands out in Uruguayan art of the 20th century.

Biography
The daughter of Ángela Perichón and cardiac surgery pioneer Dr. Manuel Benito Nieto, Amalia Nieto was the second of three children.

In 1925 she entered the Círculo de Bellas Artes and started painting with Domingo Bazzurro. In 1929 she traveled to Paris, where she spent three years studying at the Grande Chaumière with Othon Friesz and at the André Lhote Academy. She also attended a course in art history at the Sorbonne. In 1923 she visited Pedro Figari at his Parisian studio and showed him some of her paintings. Upon her return to Uruguay she held her first solo exhibition.

She frequented musical sessions at the country house of philosopher Carlos Vaz Ferreira and the busy tertulias at the house of Alfredo and Esther de Cáceres, where she met the musician and writer Felisberto Hernández, whom she married in 1937. The following year, her daughter Ana María was born. The epistolary relationship with Felisberto during his concert tours comprises more than 100 letters populated with drawings and watercolors by Amalia, sketches for the poster of Stravinsky's Petrushka recital. The relationship with Felisberto did not work, and they divorced in 1943. After the separation, Amalia cut out the drawings of the letters and framed them. They were featured in an anthological exhibition in 2008.

In 1943, Nieto received a scholarship and traveled to Chile to take a summer course at the university under Jorge Romero Brest, with whom she began an enduring friendship.

In 1955, she returned to Paris, accompanied by her daughter. She studied engraving with Johnny Friedlaender and attended mosaic courses with Gino Severini.

In 1973, she began teaching at the Círculo de Bellas Artes in Montevideo.

She also illustrated poetry books by Juana de Ibarbourou, Paul Valéry, and Ernesto Pinto. She wrote the children's play Acrobino and made the set for its premiere at the El Tinglado theater in 1972 with Laura Escalante.

Her work achieved international recognition. She was invited to exhibit in Buenos Aires, Paris, Germany, and the United States. In 2001, a significant retrospective exhibition took place at the Museum of Contemporary Art in Montevideo. The artist was 94 years old and continued painting.

Work
Amalia Nieto made numerous drawings, watercolors, paintings with oil and acrylic, sculptures, and engravings. Still lifes, informal landscapes and Parisian streets,  compositions and abstractions, give an account of the coherence of the artist's visual landscape in all the media and topics covered. The geometric synthesis present in her paintings, as well as the series she called Naturalezas muertas mentales, highlight her personal imprint on Uruguayan art of the 20th century, a free constructivism that introduces a conceptual and sensitive dimension, close to the metaphysical art of Giorgio Morandi. In the catalog of the exhibition "Amalia Nieto. Retrospectiva 1925–1995", held at the National Museum of Visual Arts in 1995, Ángel Kalenberg noted that she, together with Petrona Viera, made "the most substantial contribution to the history of the Uruguayan plastic arts."

Awards
 Mention at the 3rd São Paulo Art Biennial (1957)
 Grand Prize for Painting at the 31st National Salon (1967)
 Grand Prize for Sculpture at the 33rd National Salon (1969)
 Figari Award from the Central Bank of Uruguay in recognition of her career (1995)
  from B'nai B'rith Uruguay (1999)

References

External links
 Amalia Nieto at the National Museum of Visual Arts
 Catalogue of the exposition "Amalia Nieto: cartas a Felisberto"

1907 births
2003 deaths
20th-century engravers
20th-century Uruguayan painters
20th-century women artists
People from Montevideo
Uruguayan sculptors
Uruguayan women painters
Uruguayan women sculptors
Women engravers